Alligatorium is an extinct genus of atoposaurid crocodylomorph from Late Jurassic marine deposits in France.

Systematics
The type species is A. meyeri, named in 1871 from a single specimen from Cerin, eastern France. Two more nominal species, A. franconicum, named in 1906, and A paintenense, named in 1961, are based on now-missing specimens from Bavaria, southern Germany, and were synonymized into a single species, for which A. franconicum has priority. A 2016 review of Atoposauridae removed A. franconicum from Alligatorium and placed at Neosuchia incertae sedis.

Alligatorium depereti, described in 1915, was reassigned to its own genus, Montsecosuchus, in 1988.

References	

Late Jurassic crocodylomorphs of Europe
Neosuchians
Fossil taxa described in 1871
Prehistoric pseudosuchian genera